Mom Rajawongse Chalermchatri Yukol (born September 28, 1985), is a Thai film and television series director. He started his career as a radio host. He directed the films Sarawat Maba (2013), The Black Death (2013). He is directing the television series The Legend of King Naresuan: The Series. Yukol is usually known by his nickname Adam.

Early life 
He is the son of Chatrichalerm Yukol and Kamala Yukol and graduated in film from Australia. He was 3rd assistant director in film series King Naresuan. Later he created entertainment work in Internet, film websites, behind the scenes from film and all promotional merchandise at FukDuk company. He lectured at leading universities such as Chulalongkorn University, Thammasat University, Bangkok University and Assumption University.

He launched the FuKDuK website, a TV service that offers its own content on October 14, 2007. He regularly hosts radio shows in FM 96.5 MHz in the Mass Communication Organization of Thailand (MCOT) He is currently the Program Director of Viu Thailand.

Filmography

Film 
 Sarawat Maba (2013)
 The Black Death (2015)
 Thai Niyom, Episode: Step (2016–Short fim)
 Tossapith Thammaracha, Episode: donate (2016–Short fim)

Television  
 Tee Sam: The Series, Episode: Viral Vlogger (2016)
 The Legend of King Naresuan: The Series (2017)

References

External links 
 
 

1985 births
Living people
Chalermchatri Yukol
Chalermchatri Yukol
Chalermchatri Yukol
Chalermchatri Yukol